Boyd Franklin "Cotton" Converse (February 18, 1932 – May 31, 2010) was an American football coach and college administrator.  He served as the head football coach at Wichita State University for one season in 1967, compiling a record of 2–7–1. From 1964 to 1966 he was the head football coach at Kilgore College, where he led his team to the NJCAA National Football Championship in 1966.  Converse died in 2010 after a long illness.

Head coaching record

College

References

1932 births
2010 deaths
Wichita State Shockers football coaches
Junior college football coaches in the United States
People from Johnston County, Oklahoma